Rokas Milevičius (born 10 December 1986 in Kaunas) is an yacht sailor from Lithuania.

Biography 
Studied in Lithuanian Academy of Physical Education.

In 2014 Milevičius joined Dutch sailing team Brunel for the 2014–15 Volvo Ocean Race. In 2023 Milevičius led team Ambersail II at the 2023 The Ocean Race.

Achievements 
2010 European championships – 88th;
2012 World championships – 42nd;
2012 Summer Olympics, Laser Class - 42nd

References

External links
 
 
 
 

Lithuanian male sailors (sport)
1986 births
Living people
Sailors at the 2012 Summer Olympics – Laser
Olympic sailors of Lithuania
Volvo Ocean Race sailors
Sportspeople from Kaunas